P900 may refer to:

Sony Ericsson P900, a Symbian OS v7.0 based smartphone
Nikon Coolpix P900, a superzoom digital bridge camera

See also